Entertainment for All Expo or E for All was a public video game trade show, created to allow the general public to see and experience new products from the video game industry. The inaugural E for All Expo was open October 18 to October 21, 2007, at the Los Angeles Convention Center.
The Second E For All Convention took place from October 3 through October 5, 2008 at the Los Angeles Convention Center.

History
On January 5, 2007, IDG World Expo, announced the first annual E for All Expo, the only video game event to receive the endorsement of the Entertainment Software Association (ESA), the trade organization that organized the Electronic Entertainment Expo (E3). E for All was launched in response to ESA's reorganization of the E3 event to the E3 Business and Media Summit, where only invitees from the press and in the industry can attend. The expo offers an opportunity for the general public to see and try new products.

On September 16, 2007, Games Media Properties, announced that they will no longer produce the World Series of Video Games. This announcement reduced the size of Entertainment for All's show floor by 35%.

IDG World Expo is also responsible for producing tradeshows, conferences and events such as Macworld, LinuxWorld, and GreenXchange Xpo.

The 2007 Expo had an attendance of about 18,000.

Two highly anticipated titles, Nintendo's Super Smash Bros. Brawl and Konami's Metal Gear Solid 4: Guns of the Patriots were present in playable form. Organizers considered the event a success.

IDG World Expo announced the date for the 2008 Entertainment For All show months before their 2007 took place. They announced that the date would be August 28–30, the same weekend that the annual Penny Arcade Expo video game show falls on. The event took place October 3–5.

E for All is now no longer held because the convention was merged back into the Electronic Entertainment Expo by the ESA in time for E3 2009.

In 2017, almost a decade after the last E for All, E3 became open to the public for the first time.

See also
Consumer Electronics Show
Electronic Entertainment Expo
Game Developers Conference
Games Convention — held in Leipzig, Germany
Gamescom - will be held in Cologne, successor to GC
Penny Arcade Expo
SpaceWorld — Nintendo exclusive game expo
Tokyo Game Show — Game expo held in Tokyo, Japan
Video Games Live
World Series of Video Games

References

External links

Official IDG World Expo site
Official Into The Pixel site
Official Video Games Live site
Official World Series of Video Games site

Recurring events established in 2007
Trade shows in the United States
Defunct gaming conventions
International Data Group